Mario Vergara (16 November 1910 – 24 May 1950) was an Italian Catholic priest of the Pontifical Institute for Foreign Missions who was killed in Burma (now Myanmar) in 1950. He was beatified in 2014 after the recognition of his martyrdom.

Biography
Mario Vergara was born on 16 November 1910 and was baptized on 20 November - a week after his birth. He was the last of nine children.

He entered the seminary in Aversa and studied there until the age of 17 when he was admitted to a seminary in Naples. It was there where his missionary vocation emerged. In 1929, he entered the seminary in Monza and he later received the tonsure and the minor orders by the Bishop of Aversa in 1932.

He was admitted into the novitiate of the Pontifical Institute for Foreign Missions in August 1933 and he was ordained to the priesthood on 26 August 1934 by the Cardinal Archbishop of Milan Alfredo Ildefonso Schuster. By September that same year, he travelled to Burma to begin his missionary activities.

Vergara was entrusted a small village and it was there that he ensured that there be regular catechesis lessons and the celebration of the sacraments. He also established various assistance services and an orphanage for children.

When World War II started, Vergara was interned in a British concentration camp in India in 1940. After he was released he travelled to Delhi and later to Calcutta in June 1946. It was there that he underwent nephrectomy surgery. He returned to Burma in 1947 and continued his mission there, and met the catechist Isidore Ngei Ko Lat. The two worked together in the villages.

After the nation gained independence in 1948, both Vergara and Ko Lat received death threats. This culminated in 1950 when the two were both murdered by guerillas.

Beatification
The Congregation for the Causes of Saints approved the cause of beatification which commenced on 23 October 2001. This bestowed upon him the title of Servant of God. Pope Francis approved his and Isidoro Ngei Ko Lat's martyrdom on 9 December 2013, thus, allowing for their beatification. Cardinal Angelo Amato represented the pope at the beatification on 24 May 2014.

References

External links
Hagiography Circle
Saints SQPN

1910 births
1950 deaths
Italian beatified people
Beatifications by Pope Francis
20th-century venerated Christians
20th-century Roman Catholic martyrs
Roman Catholic missionaries in Myanmar